Canberra Darters are a former Australian netball team based in Canberra, Australian Capital Territory. The team was originally formed as a partnership between the Australian Institute of Sport and Netball ACT. Between 2003 and 2007 they played in the Commonwealth Bank Trophy as AIS Canberra Darters. The AIS and Netball ACT subsequently entered separate teams in the Australian Netball League. Canberra Darters were the Netball ACT team in the ANL between 2008 and 2016. In 2017 they were replaced in the ANL by Canberra Giants.

History

Commonwealth Bank Trophy
AIS Canberra Darters was originally formed as a partnership between the Australian Institute of Sport and Netball ACT. They subsequently entered a combined team in the Commonwealth Bank Trophy. They joined the competition in 2003, replacing Adelaide Ravens. They continued to play in this competition until its demise in 2007. Their best performance came in 2004 when they finished 5th.

Regular season stats

Australian Netball League
The AIS and Netball ACT subsequently entered separate teams in the Australian Netball League with the Netball ACT team continuing to use the Canberra Darters name. Darters played in the ANL between 2008 and 2016. In 2017 they were replaced in the ANL by Canberra Giants.

Regular season stats

Home venues
Darters played their home games at the AIS Arena and the SolarHub ACT Netball Centre.

Notable former players

Internationals

 Hayley Mulheron
 Fiona Themann

Commonwealth Bank Trophy

Australian Netball League
 Jasmine Keene
 Hayley Mulheron
 Caitlyn Strachan
 Fiona Themann

Head coaches

References

 
Defunct netball teams in Australia
Darters
Australian Institute of Sport (netball)
Commonwealth Bank Trophy teams
Australian Netball League teams
2003 establishments in Australia
Sports clubs established in 2003
Netball in the Australian Capital Territory